Kosuty may refer to:

Košúty, Slovakia
 Košúty, Martin, Slovakia
Kosuty, Lublin Voivodeship, east Poland
Kosuty, Masovian Voivodeship, east-central Poland